Seong-geun or Sung-keun, also spelled Song-gun, is a Korean masculine given name. Its meaning differs based on the hanja used to write each syllable of the name. There are 27 hanja with the reading "seong" and 18 hanja with the reading "geun" on the South Korean government's official list of hanja which may be registered for use in given names.

People with this name include
Kim Sung-keun (born 1942), South Korean baseball player
Kim Song-gun (born 1945), North Korean painter
Moon Sung-keun (born 1953), South Korean actor and politician
Choi Sung-keun (born 1991), South Korean footballer

See also
List of Korean given names

References

Korean masculine given names